The 2006 World University Championships are the World Championships organized by the International University Sports Federation (FISU) in 2006. 27 World University Championships were organized attracting 5,852 participants from a total of 209 (of which 90 different) countries.

Archery
The 6th World University Archery Championship took place in Vinicne, Slovakia from 14 to 17 June 2006.

Badminton
The 9th World University Badminton Championship took place in Wuhan, China from 10 to 15 October 2006.

Baseball
The 3rd World University Baseball Championship took place in La Habana, Cuba from 6 to 16 August 2006.

Beach Volleyball
The 3rd World University Beach Volleyball Championship took place in Protaras, Cyprus from 14 to 18 June 2006.

Boxing

The 2nd World University Boxing Championship took place in Almaty, Kazakhstan from 2 to 9 October 2006.

Bridge
The 3rd World University Bridge Championship took place in Tianjin City, China from 21 to 26 October 2006.

Chess
The 9th World University Chess Championship took place in Lagos, Nigeria.

Cross Country
The 15th World University Cross Country Championship took place in Algiers, Algeria.

Cycling

The 4th World University Cycling Championship took place in Antwerp and Herentals, Belgium from 22 to 26 March 2006.

Road Cycling

Cyclo-cross

Equestrian
The 7th World University Equestrian Championship took place in La Rochelle, France.

Canoe Slalom
The 5th World University Wild Water Canoeing Championship took place in Krakow, Poland from 7 to 10 September 2006.

Floorball
The 2nd World University Floorball Championship took place in Bern, Switzerland.

Futsal
The 10th World University Futsal Championship took place in Poznań, Poland.

Golf
The 11th World University Golf Championship took place in Torino, Italy.

Handball
The 18th World University Handball Championship took place in Gdańsk, Poland.

Karate
The 5th World University Karate Championship took place in New York City, United States.

Match Racing
The 3rd World University Match Racing Championship took place in Palma de Mallorca, Spain.

Orienteering
The 15th World University Orienteering Championship took place in Košice, Slovakia from 14 to 20 August 2006.

Rowing
The 9th World University Rowing Championship took place in Trakai, Lithuania.

Rugby Sevens
The 2nd World University Rugby Sevens Championship took place in Rome, Italy.

Softball
The 2nd World University Softball Championship took place in Tainan City, Taiwan.

Squash
The 5th World University Squash Championship took place in Szeged, Hungary.

Taekwondo
The 9th World University Taekwondo Championship took place in Valencia, Spain.

Triathlon
The 9th World University Triathlon Championship took place in Lausanne, Switzerland.

Woodball
The 1st World University Woodball Championship took place in Taipei City, Taiwan.

Wrestling
The 7th World University Wrestling Championship took place in Ulaanbaatar, Mongolia.

References

 
University